Street Roots is a Portland, Oregon, United States based homeless advocacy group and a weekly alternative newspaper that covers homeless issues. The newsprint is sold by and for the homeless in Portland. The paper is published every Friday and sold through vendors who are currently or formerly homeless. The paper's editorial position is homeless advocacy. Vendors purchase the paper for 25 cents and sell them for $1 and keep the difference of 75 cents. The paper features alternative news, interviews, and poetry written by local journalists as well as the homeless and those who work with them.

History
Street Roots was established in 1999. Israel Bayer was hired as executive director a few years later, and remained in that position for 15 years, performing numerous duties as he emerged as "one of Portland's leading moral authorities on homelessness," according to coverage in the Willamette Week. He announced his departure in 2017.

In 2007, it was described as the "most vocal opponent" of a proposed "sit-lie ordinance" championed by the Portland Business Alliance and then-Mayor Tom Potter. Its acceptance of a $30,000 grant from Street Access For Everyone (SAFE), at a time when its annual budget was $90,000, prompted concerns about editorial influence. The funding was designated for printing 10,000 resource guides that listed services for the homeless and an employee to assemble the guides. The executive director at the time of Street Roots Israel Bayer asserted the paper would not change its editorial position against the sit-lie ordinance. Kyle Chisek, a non-voting member of SAFE at the time announced the money wasn't intended to influence newspaper's editorial position. Chisek added that SAFE committee and Street Roots shared commitment to "providing a service for the homeless." Initially, the city was concerned that this guide might be a duplicate of services already offered by the government and other non-profit agencies.

The Rose City Resource, a guide to local services related to homelessness, began as a four-page section of the paper in 1999, was launched as a separate publication following the SAFE grant. It served as a model for a similar publication established in Seattle in 2018. By 2018, the guide had grown to 104 pages, and was published twice a year.

In recent years, Street Roots has continued to take positions on public policy related to homelessness.

Distribution 
Papers are sold for $1 each. Vendors purchase the copies of papers for 25 cents each and keep the difference of 75 cents.

References

Further reading

External links

 

1998 establishments in Oregon
Homelessness in Oregon
Newspapers published in Portland, Oregon
Publications established in 1998
Street newspapers
Advocacy groups in the United States